SS Josiah Parker was a liberty ship built during World War II by Delta Shipbuilding Company, New Orleans, an EC2-S-C1 Type. The ship was named for Josiah Parker (1751 – 1810), an American politician who was a member of the United States House of Representatives from Virginia in the First through Sixth United States Congresses.

The SS Josiah Parker's Official Number was 242368. It was owned by the United States War Shipping Administration. Its MC Hull No. was 0132. It was laid down on July 16, 1942 and launched  September 26, 1942.

Convoy UGS-37, 1944 
SS Josiah Parker was one of the 37 ships carrying United States Navy Armed Guards in Convoy UGS-37, April 11–12, 1944.
"They were some 35 miles east of Algiers near midnight of April 11 and 12 when an undetermined number of enemy planes attacked. No ship carrying Armed Guards was hit by the enemy, but several ships received minor damage from the gunfire of other ships. Practically all ships opened fire and the amount of flak falling was quite heavy ... The Josiah Parker reported an explosion on one of the escorts and indicated that she too was hit by shell fragments."

The SS Josiah Parker was sold to private interests in 1947 and scrapped in 1964.

References

External links 
Deka (ex- Epinal, ex- Josiah Parker) at unknown date and location between December 1963 and May 1964

Liberty ships
J
1942 ships